Heterochorista trivialis is a species of moth of the family Tortricidae. It is found in Papua New Guinea.

References

Moths described in 1984
Archipini
Moths of Papua New Guinea
Taxa named by Marianne Horak